Brenda Dervin, was a professor of communication at Ohio State University, working in the fields communication and library and information science.  Her research about information seeking and information use led to the development of the sense-making methodology (Ross, Nilsen, & Dewdney, 2003, p. 93).  Dervin received a bachelor's degree in journalism and home economics from Cornell University, with a minor in philosophy of religion, and her M.S. and PhD degrees in communication research from Michigan State University.  In 1986 she acted as the first president of the International Communication Association.  Dervin reviews articles and also is on editorial boards for communication and library and information science journals. 

She died in Seattle on the 31st December 2022

Publications

Dervin, B. (2003a).  Audience as listener and learner, teacher and confidante: The sense-making approach.  In B. Dervin, L. Foreman-Wernet, & E. Launterbach (Eds.), Sense-making methodology reader: Selected writings of Brenda Dervin (pp. 215–231). Cresskill, NJ: Hampton Press, Inc.
Dervin, B. (2003b).  Information as non-sense; information as sense: The communication technology connection.  In B. Dervin, L. Foreman-Wernet, & E. Launterbach (Eds.), Sense-making methodology reader: Selected writings of Brenda Dervin (pp. 293–308). Cresskill, NJ: Hampton Press, Inc.

References

Further reading
Neill, S. D. (1992).  The dilemma of the subjective in information organization and retrieval.  Dilemmas in the study of information.  Westport: Greenwood Press.
Ross, C. S., Nilsen, K., & Dewdney, P.  (2002).  Conducting the reference interview.  New York: Neal-Schuman Publishers, Inc.

External links
Sense-Making [archived outdated content]
 Sense Making references/bibliography
Sense-Making Methodology Institute: A collection of Dervin’s published papers 

Cornell University alumni
Michigan State University alumni
Ohio State University faculty
Perception
Year of birth missing (living people)
Living people
American women non-fiction writers
American women academics
21st-century American women